Sonic Powered Co., Ltd. is a Japanese software development company based in Nagoya, Aichi Prefecture. It mainly focuses on mobile and console games, and software for business purposes.

History 
Sonic Powered was first formed in Nagoya on February 14, 1995. Then incorporated on April 1, 1998.
The company was developing games such as Tetris and Space invaders for Sharp Zaurus, a PDA of Japanese brand Sharp.

In 2006, the company started developing simulation games such as I am an Air Traffic Controller Airport Hero (for PSP and later for 3DS) and later Japanese Rail Sim 3D for 3DS. The Japanese Rail Sim series uses real-life footage of Japanese railways.
A few of the Airport Hero and most of the Japanese Rail Sim games are translated and released in North America and Europe. And following the game Waku Waku Sweets: Happy Sweets Making for 3DS being localized and released in 2018, over 4 years after its original release in Japan, it seems fair to assume the company is not focussing solely on the Japanese market anymore.

Video Games 
Game in all territories:
Actraiser Renaissance (2021, Switch, PS4)

Games only in Japanese:

Moomin-Dani no Okurimono (2009, Nintendo DS)
Boku wa Koukuu Kanseikan: Airport Hero Naha (2010, PlayStation Portable)
Boku wa Koukuu Kanseikan: Airport Hero Shinchitose (2010, PlayStation Portable)
Boku wa Koukuu Kanseikan: Airport Hero Kankuu (2010, PlayStation Portable)
Akumu no Youkai Mura (2011, Nintendo DS)
@field (2012, PlayStation Vita)
Boku wa Koukuu Kanseikan: Airport Hero 3D Haneda with JAL (2012, Nintendo 3DS)
Kira*Meki Oshare Salon! Watashi no Shigoto wa Biyoushi-San (2013, Nintendo 3DS)
Boku wa Koukuu Kanseikan: Airport Hero 3D - Naha Premium (2013, Nintendo 3DS)
Boku wa Koukuu Kanseikan: Airport Hero 3D - Shin Chitose with JAL (2013, Nintendo 3DS)
Gakki de Asobo: Tanoshii Douyou(1) (Nintendo 3DS, 2014)
Gakki de Asobo: Tanoshii Douyou(2) (Nintendo 3DS, 2014)
Gakki de Asobo: Tanoshii Douyou(3) (Nintendo 3DS, 2014)
Boku wa Koukuu Kanseikan: Airport Hero 3D - Haneda All Stars (2015, Nintendo 3DS)
Tetsudou Nippon! Rosen Tabi: Oumi Tetsudou-hen (2015, Nintendo 3DS)
Tetsudou Nippon! Rosen Tabi: Joumou Denki Tetsudou-hen (2015, Nintendo 3DS)
Boku wa Koukuu Kanseikan: Airport Hero 3D - Kankuu All Stars (2015, Nintendo 3DS)
Tetsudou Nippon! Rosen Tabi: Aizu Tetsudou-hen (2016, Nintendo 3DS)
Boku wa Koukuu Kanseikan: Airport Hero 3D - Narita / Haneda All Stars Pack (2017, Nintendo 3DS)
Tetsudou Nippon! Rosen Tabi: Jouge-sen Shuuroku Double Pack (2017, Nintendo 3DS)
Waku Waku Sweets: Amai Okashi ga Dekiru kana? (2018, Nintendo Switch)
Railroad Nippon! Lines Sangi Railway Edition (2021, Nintendo Switch)
Railroad Nippon! Lines Akichi Railway Edition (2022, Nintendo Switch)

Games also released in other languages:

Air Traffic Chaos (2007, Nintendo DS)
MiniCopter: Adventure Flight (2007, Nintendo Wii)
From the Abyss (2008, Nintendo DS)
The Crush Star (2010, iPhone/iPad,)
I am an Air Traffic Controller Airport Hero Tokyo (2010, PlayStation Portable)
Anonymous Notes: Chapter 1 - From the Abyss (2011, Nintendo DSiWare)
Anonymous Notes: Chapter 2 - From the Abyss (2011, Nintendo DSiWare)
Anonymous Notes: Chapter 3 - From the Abyss (2012, Nintendo DSiWare)
I am an Air Traffic Controller Airport Hero Hawaii (2012, Nintendo 3DS)
Anonymous Notes: Chapter 4 - From the Abyss (2014, Nintendo DSiWare)
SKYPEACE (2014. Nintendo 3DS)
I am an air traffic controller: Airport Hero - Osaka-KIX (2014, Nintendo 3DS)
Japanese Rail Sim 3D: Journey to Kyoto (2014, Nintendo 3DS)
I am an Air Traffic Controller: Airport Hero Narita (2014, Nintendo 3DS)
Japanese Rail Sim 3D: Journey in Suburbs #1 (2015, Nintendo 3DS)
Japanese Rail Sim 3D: Monorail Trip to Okinawa (2015, Nintendo 3DS)
Japanese Rail Sim 3D: Journey in Suburbs #1 Vol. 2 (2016, Nintendo 3DS)
Japanese Rail Sim 3D: Journey in Suburbs #1 Vol. 3 (2016, Nintendo 3DS)
Japanese Rail Sim 3D: Journey in Suburbs #1 Vol. 4 (2016, Nintendo 3DS)
Japanese Rail Sim 3D: Journey in Suburbs #2 (2017, Nintendo 3DS)
Japanese Rail Sim 3D: Travel of Steam (2017, Nintendo 3DS)
Waku Waku Sweets: Happy Sweets Making (2018, Nintendo 3DS)
SKYPEACE (2018, Nintendo Switch)
Japanese Rail Sim 3D: 5 types of trains (2018, Nintendo 3DS)
Japanese Rail Sim: Journey to Kyoto (2019, Nintendo Switch)

References

External links 
 [Japanese]

Video game companies of Japan
Video game development companies
Companies established in 1998
Companies based in Nagoya